Salto Mortale is a 1953 West German drama film directed by Viktor Tourjansky and starring Margot Hielscher, Philip Dorn and Karlheinz Böhm.

It was shot at the Bavaria Studios in Munich and at the city's Zirkus Crone. The film's sets were designed by the art directors Hans Kuhnert and Theo Zwierski.

Cast
 Margot Hielscher as Verena
 Philip Dorn as Cadenos
 Karlheinz Böhm as Manfred
 Paul Kemp as Willi
 Nicolas Koline as Mischa
 Christine Kaufmann as Dascha
 Käthe Itter as Martha
 Erika Remberg as Rita
 Gunnar Möller as Kurt
 Willy Rösner as Direktor Jansen
 Gert Fröbe as Jan
 Angela Cenery as Sekretärin
 Viktor Afritsch
 Peter Alexander as Singer
 Annelise Benz
 Circus Krone
 Sybille Dochtermann
 Werner Fuetterer
 Hildegard Hornauer
Christl Lazarus
 Leila Negra as Singer
 Karl Schaidler
 Treska
 Uno Myggan Ericson

References

Bibliography 
 Fenner, Angelica. Race under Reconstruction in German Cinema: Robert Stemmle's Toxi. University of Toronto Press, 2011.
 Singer, Michael. Film Directors. Lone Eagle Publishing, 2002.

External links
 

1953 films
1953 drama films
German drama films
West German films
1950s German-language films
Circus films
Films directed by Victor Tourjansky
German black-and-white films
Films shot at Bavaria Studios
1950s German films